The British Overseas Territory of Gibraltar has no administrative divisions. It is, however, divided into seven Major Residential Areas, which are further divided into Enumeration Areas, used for statistical purposes.

The Major Residential Areas are listed below, with population figures from the 2012 Census:

References